Purushan Kadalundy (born 15 November 1957; Kadalundi) is a member of 13th Kerala Legislative Assembly. He belongs to Communist Party of India (Marxist) and represents Balussery constituency.

Political and literary life
He started his political career through K.S.Y.F. He was arrested for presenting the play Pattini (hunger) during national emergency. He has received Jyothi Bahulae National Award of Kendra Dalit Sahitya Academy (2002), Abu Dhabi Sakthi Award (2005), Sreekantan Nair Smaraka Puraskaram, V.K. Krishana Menon Award, Thoppil Bhasi Award and National Safety Award. He has served as the secretary of Kerala Sahitya Academy. Presently, he is the state vice president of Purogamana Kala Sahitya Sangam and member of Samskarika Kshemanithi Board. He is also the director of Kerala SC/ST Development Corporation and Chairman of Orchard Theatre for Children.

Personal life
He is the son of P.K Kanaran and Ammalukutty. He is a playwright, and writer. He is married to M.C Chandrika and has three sons. He resides at Chevarambalam, Kozhikode.

References

Members of the Kerala Legislative Assembly
1947 births
Communist Party of India (Marxist) politicians from Kerala
Living people